The 39th Army Corps was an Army corps in the Imperial Russian Army.

Part of
8th Army: 1915–1916
Russian Special Army: 1916–1917

Corps of the Russian Empire
Military units and formations established in 1915
Military units and formations disestablished in 1917